La Serena is a city and commune in northern Chile, capital of the Coquimbo Region. Founded in 1544, it is the country's second oldest city after the national capital, Santiago. As of 2012, it had a communal population of roughly 200,000, and was one of the fastest-growing areas of Chile.

The city is an important tourist destination for Chileans and Argentines, especially during the summer, where people go to visit the beaches. It is in the headquarters of the University of La Serena and also is home to the Roman Catholic Archdiocese of La Serena, one of five Catholic Archdioceses of the Catholic Church in Chile.

History
The sector is currently located where the city was inhabited by the pre-Hispanic village called Viluma or Vilumanque (Mapudungún Snakes and condors). 

La Serena was founded on the orders of the Spaniard Pedro de Valdivia in order to provide a sea link to maintain permanent contact between Santiago and Lima in the Viceroyalty of Peru. For this he would need a place for his troops to rest and eat. The village was founded by captain Juan Bohón with the name "Villanueva de La Serena". Although the exact date is disputed, probable dates include 15 November or 30 December 1543 and 4 September 1544. Many historians simply say that it was founded in 1544. Five years later, from the night of 11 January 1549 until the following day, a native uprising totally destroyed and burned the village, killing nearly every Spaniard. Pedro de Valdivia ordered Captain Francisco de Aguirre to re-establish the city later the same year on 26 August under the name of San Bartolomé de La Serena (now patron saint of the city), in the same place where the Plaza de Armas stands today. A few years later, on 4 May 1552, King Carlos I of Spain by royal decree gave it the title of city. One of the reasons to establish La Serena was to control Mapuche groups that had begun to migrate north following the Spanish founding of Santiago in 1541. Indeed, northern Mapuche groups appear to have responded to the Spanish conquest by abandoning their best agricultural lands and moving to remote parts away from the invaders.

During the 17th century, the city suffered repeated attacks from privateers, including Francis Drake who opened the Pacific route to the English in 1578. Bartholomew Sharp, who partly burned and looted in 1680, and Edward Davis, who set fire to the convent of Santo Domingo in 1686, caused great fear among the population, forcing the defence of the city in 1700. In addition to these attacks, the city was almost totally destroyed by the earthquake of 8 July 1730.

During the Revolution of 1859, a rebellion against the conservative government, the city was taken by forces led by Pedro Leon Gallo. Gallo's forces were defeated at the Battle of Cerro Grande [es] by an army from Santiago, which then occupied the city.

Architecture

Between 1948 and 1952, president Gabriel González Videla prepared the Plan Serena, a project in which the city was renewed with investments and urban redevelopment that would imprint a single seal on the country. It began to take hold in the role of services, to rescue and to develop its own architectural style known as Colonial Revival. The city is the seat of the Roman Catholic Archdiocese of La Serena. The cathedral, built from the same stone and clade, dates from the 19th century. It must be said that although it lacks the same historical value as the older churches, this is a stone building in a country prone to seismic activity, and has survived various earthquakes. Indeed, during centuries of existence, there is almost no visible damage. All of these churches, along with others of minor importance, provide a unique urban landscape, an image for the city, giving it the nickname "The City of Churches."

Its traditional architecture consists of a series of housing and public buildings, of late 19th-century vintage style, built with wood from the US state of Oregon brought to Chile as counterweight in vessels sailing to the nearby port of Coquimbo to load copper and other minerals for transport back to the US. This Oregon pine and the use of adobe create the genuine image of the city.

There is also a number of remarkable and valuable small churches built of sedimentary stone quarried  to the north of the Elqui River, having a characteristic color and texture formed by myriad small shells. These churches are all roughly 350 years old and have undergone restoration to varying degrees, bringing them back to their original form. San Francisco, San Agustín, Santo Domingo are the names of a few of them. In 1920, he began to take shape a new economic boom in the mining of iron, attracting capital and human contingent, resulting in a further change in the urban structure.

Currently, the city has its own architectural style (known as "neocolonial"), which is differentiated from other cities, preserving old buildings in colonial style, with many important National Monuments, mixing it with modern buildings but each one in turn follows the regulatory framework in the construction of these structures which should each have features to maintain the colonial style of the city. In the center of the city until 2008, it is still not possible to identify buildings over eight stories high for a municipal status, however towards the coastal area of the Avenida del Mar, one begins to see a great real estate boom that is distinguished by high-rise buildings, ranging from La Serena running south and along the coast to the neighboring city of Coquimbo.

Demography
As of the 2012 census, La Serena had a communal population of 198,164, and the Greater La Serena area had a population of around 400,000.

As of the 2002 census (of the National Statistics Institute) it had 160,148 inhabitants (77,385 men and 82,763 women). Of these, 147,815 (92.3%) lived in urban areas and 12,333 (7.7%) in rural areas. The population grew by 32.6% (39,332 persons) between the 1992 and 2002 censuses, making it one of the fastest-growing regions of the country. Had that growth continued, INE estimated the population would increase to 205,120 by 2008 and 244,070 by 2012, so the growth rate has dropped since then.

A few of the major city sectors are: El Centro ("downtown"), Peñuelas (actually a suburb between La Serena and Coquimbo), San Joaquín (neighborhood on a hill overlooking the ocean), La Florida, Las Compañías ("the companies"), Cerro Grande ("big hill"), La Antena and the new El Milagro ("the miracle") development.

Geography

The city is located on ocean terraces, which are clearly noticeable from the coastal area, through downtown to the eastern sector Vicuña way. The rest of the urban area is based on several small hills, valleys and plains.

The city is commonly divided into various sectors. In the north is the airline sector, subdivided into two sub-sectors called High and Low Company. Nearby is San Pedro Creek. To the south are the areas of La Pampa, San Joaquin and the El Milagro. To the east are the sectors of La Antena, Juan XXIII, La Florida, Colina El Pino and the University District. Finally, to the west is the area of Avenida del Mar. Areas surrounding the city are mainly areas for growing vegetables, and there are a large number of plantations for the cultivation of chirimoyas, avocados and oranges, in addition to where vegetation has an average with some areas found mainly eucalyptus forests. These areas are normally conducive to wildfires sparked during the summer season (January–February).

Climate
La Serena has a cool desert climate, similar to nearby places in that it is clearly seasonal – in summer there is an absence of precipitation, but with abundant morning cloudiness and drizzle. which dissipates around noon, giving way to clear skies and  days.

Being located in a coastal zone, the minimums and maximums are moderated by the maritime influence and the temperature of the cold Humboldt Current. The driest year has been 1979 with only , whilst recent years, as in central Chile and Zona Sur, have tended to be drier than the long-term mean.

Political administration

As a commune, La Serena is a third-level administrative division of Chile administered by a municipal council, headed by a mayor who is directly elected every four years. The 2012-2016 mayor is Roberto Jacob Jure (PRSD).

Within the electoral divisions of Chile, La Serena is represented in the Chamber of Deputies by Mario Bertolino (RN) and Marcelo Díaz (PS) as part of the 7th electoral district, (together with La Higuera, Vicuña, Paihuano and Andacollo). The commune is represented in the Senate by Sergio Gahona Salazar (UDI), Daniel Núñez Arancibia (PC) and Matías Walker Prieto (PDC) as part of the fourth senatorial constituency (Coquimbo Region).

Economy

In the last decades, tourism has turned into one of the most important economic activities. The population doubles in the summer months,  principally for the beaches, recreational activities, musical festivals, concerts, and Fashion Week. In addition, the city is an obligatory stop for hundreds of pilgrims  that arrive to the city of Coquimbo, where during The Serenade they find lodging for visiting the zone and Valle de Elqui.

In this city there are located branches of the more important chain stores of the country, Mall Plaza La Serena, which has the national shops Falabella and París. Also Mall Puerta Del Mar, contains two supermarkets, and regional multistores, such as La Elegante, and shops for home and construction. The downtown is one of the places with major economic and financial institutions of the Coquimbo Region.

Tourism

The old part of the city is the largest and most important urban "traditional area" (zona típica) in Chile. The churches are distinguished by many styles of belfries, which led to the city being nicknamed "the city of the belfries".

The Church Cathedral of La Serena was designated a Historical Monument in 1981. Construction was initiated by the French architect Jean Herbage in 1844, and dedicated in 1856. Inside there is an organ donated by the philanthropist Juana Ross de Edwards. The belfry dates back from the 20th century.

The town has retained its historic architecture and this, along with a selection of beaches (known as Avenida del Mar, "Sea Avenue"), has caused the city to become a significant tourist destination, attracting many foreigners (most of them Argentines from San Juan and Mendoza provinces) during January, and later Santiago residents fleeing February heat.

However, the beaches of La Serena have very rough water and are not suitable for swimming. In comparison, beaches in Coquimbo, such as The Horseshoe, have very calm waters and clean sands.

The twelve beaches along the Avenida del Mar are El Faro, Los Fuertes, Mansa, Blanca, La Barca, Cuatro Esquinas, La Marina, El Pescador, El Corsario, Hipocampo, Las Gaviotas, and Canto del Agua. All of them except the beacon are suitable for the swimming and aquatic and nautical sports. In recent years the La Serena Song Festival (created in 2004) has been gaining national importance, due to the high quality of the invited artists. A new international airport has also been improved. Real estate development along the beach has created a tourist residential development along the Elqui River.

In the southern part of Morrillos is Guanaqueros, a beautiful spot with calm waters. Water temperatures can reach   in summer. The best surf spot is Totoralillo beach with good waves. "El Cacho" wave is one of the famous and works awesome with swells.

The best Enduro mountainbike spot is Cerro Grande just behind La Serena with several trails only for advanced to expert riders.

Transport
La Serena relies on diverse means of transport to connect downtown with peripheral neighborhoods and Coquimbo, such as collective taxis, taxis and tour buses. In the past the city was the principal railway center for passenger transport to travel to the interior zone of Vicuña and Ovalle. Today, the only railroad that passes through parts of the city carries iron ore from El Romeral mine to Guayacán's port in Coquimbo.

The city relies on a bus station to provide transport from La Serena to most of the country, as well as an airport with daily flights to Santiago, Antofagasta, Arica, Copiapó and other destinations. Today there is a project to move the La Florida Airport to an area near Tongoy, Coquimbo, due to population growth close to the current airport with all the danger that this implies.

Sports

The city has a football team called Club Deportes La Serena that plays in the second tier of the Chilean league of football. Their home games are played at the La Portada stadium, which has seating for approximately 18,000 spectators. Their biggest rivals are near-neighbors Coquimbo Unido. They are nicknamed "Los Papayeros", because of the papayas that are grown near La Serena in the Elqui Valley.

Since 2007, there has been a professional tennis tournament, the Challenger de La Serena, on the courts of the Estadio Universidad del Mar, in which the first champion was the Argentine Mariano Zabaleta. The courts also hosted the Davis Cup series between Chile and Russia at the beginning of February 2007.

Education

Schools and high schools
The city of La Serena holds a wide variety of schools, lyceums and universities, concentrating great part of the academical offer in the region. Among primary and secondary education, La Serena hosts public, subsidized (owned by the State, managed by privates), and privates schools (La Serena currently holds the entirety of private schools within the Greater La Serena area).

College and universities
Among the universities present in La Serena are the University of La Serena, traditional university with its headquarters and four other campuses in the city; other institutions include the Universidad Central (Central University), Universidad Santo Tomás (Saint Thomas University), Universidad Tecnológica de Chile – INACAP (Technological University of Chile), and Universidad del Mar

Astronomical Research

La Serena holds offices for the European Southern Observatory organisation (operator of La Silla Observatory), AURA, Inc. (operator of Cerro Tololo, located in the Valle de Elqui, about 85 km east of La Serena, and Gemini observatories), and for the Carnegie Institution for Science (operator of Las Campanas Observatory). It will also be the home of the base facility of the Vera C. Rubin Observatory.

Twin towns – sister cities

La Serena is twinned with:

 Changzhou, China (2016)
 Hawaii County, United States (1994)
 Kraków, Poland (1995)
 Millbrae, United States (1963)
 San Juan, Argentina
 Talavera de la Reina, Spain
 Tenri, Japan (1966)
 Tlalnepantla de Baz, Mexico (2002)
 Castuera, Spain
 Campanario, Spain

Notable people
Juana Ross Edwards (1830–1913), philanthropist
Alberto Guerrero (1886–1959), composer, pianist and teacher

References

Notes

Bibliography

External links

 Municipality of La Serena

 
Communes of Chile
Capitals of Chilean regions
Populated places established in 1544
Populated places in Elqui Province
1544 establishments in the Spanish Empire
1544 establishments in South America
Coasts of Coquimbo Region
Populated coastal places in Chile